Nether Denton is a scattered settlement and civil parish  in rural Cumbria, England, situated about  north-east of Carlisle, by the A69 road. The population of the parish taken at the 2011 census was 415. Nether Denton is a couple of miles south-west of the village of Upper Denton. The parish contains the village of Low Row.

The present building dates from 1868 to 1870, but there has been a church on the site since the 12th century. Denton Hall, now a farmhouse, comprises a 14th-century pele tower, gabled and reduced in height, adjoining a house of 1829. The walls of the tower are 2m thick.

See also

Listed buildings in Nether Denton

References

External links
Cumbria County History Trust: Nether Denton (nb: provisional research only – see Talk page)

Civil parishes in Cumbria
Roman sites in Cumbria
Villages in Cumbria
City of Carlisle
Roman auxiliary forts in England